Ekpe is a surname. Notable people with the surname include:

 Arnold Ekpe (born 1953), Nigerian banker and businessman
 Asuquo Ekpe (died 2016), Nigerian footballer
 Simeon Ekpe (1934–2010), Nigerian judge
 Thompson Ekpe (born 1996), Nigerian footballer